Aleksandrov Ridge is the rocky, partly ice-covered ridge extending 4.7 km in north-northeast to south-southwest direction and 1.7 km wide, rising to 768 m on the west side of Lassus Mountains, northern Alexander Island in Antarctica. It surmounts Narechen Glacier to the south-southeast and Lazarev Bay to the west. The feature is named after the Bulgarian geodesist Borislav Aleksandrov, surveyor at St. Kliment Ohridski base during the 1998/99 and subsequent seasons.

Location
British mapping in 1971.

Maps
 British Antarctic Territory. Scale 1:200000 topographic map. DOS 610 – W 69 70. Tolworth, UK, 1971
 Antarctic Digital Database (ADD). Scale 1:250000 topographic map of Antarctica. Scientific Committee on Antarctic Research (SCAR). Since 1993, regularly upgraded and updated

Notes

References
 Bulgarian Antarctic Gazetteer. Antarctic Place-names Commission. (details in Bulgarian, basic data in English)
 Aleksandrov Ridge. SCAR Composite Gazetteer of Antarctica

External links
 Aleksandrov Ridge. Adjusted Copernix satellite image

Devol
Bulgaria and the Antarctic